Montfleury may mean:

 the stage name of Zacharie Jacob, a French actor and playwright of the 17th century
 the stage name of Antoine Jacob, a French actor and playwright, son of Zacharie
 a castle in Aosta
 part of the city of Tunis
 convent to which Mme de Tencin was confined against her will in 1708
 fictional character in Cyrano de Bergerac